Hector Morison (1850 – 4 June 1939) was a British stockbroker and Liberal Party politician.

He was the son of John Morison of Glasgow, and was educated at the city's academy and university. He joined a Glasgow firm of chartered accountants and stockbrokers, but found his opportunities too limited. Accordingly, in 1879 he moved to London, and in 1886 became a member of the London Stock Exchange.

In 1876 Morison had married Josephine Ashton, member of a Manchester family of textile industrialists. He built up an expertise in the textile industry, and was a principal trader in the shares of J & P Coats, the Bradford Dyers Association and the English Sewing Cotton Company.

Morison was politically a man of strong Liberal views. He was elected to the Croydon School Board, and was the party's parliamentary candidate at Lewes in 1906 and 
at Eastbourne in January and December, 1910.

In May 1912, Horatio Bottomley, the controversial Liberal MP for Hackney South, was forced to his resign his seat when he was declared bankrupt. Bottomley had been unpopular with a large portion of the party's activists in Hackney, who had run their own candidate against him in December 1910. The two Liberal factions came together to nominate Morison for the vacancy. He was comfortably elected at the by-election held on 24 May.

Morison served only one term as a member of the Commons. He chose to retire at the next general election in 1918. Horatio Bottomley, whose bankruptcy had been annulled, regained the Hackney South seat as an independent.

Hector Morison played no further part in public life, living in quiet retirement. He died, aged 89, at his home "Beechcroft", Kenley, near Croydon, in June 1939.

References

External links 
 Hector Morison's contributions in parliament

Alumni of the University of Glasgow
1850 births
1939 deaths
Liberal Party (UK) MPs for English constituencies
Hackney Members of Parliament
UK MPs 1910–1918
British stockbrokers
People educated at the Glasgow Academy
20th-century Scottish politicians